If Children is the debut studio album by Baltimore-based band Wye Oak. The album was originally released in 2007, but was re-released on April 8, 2008 by Merge Records.

Critical reception

Writing for Pitchfork, Mike Powell gave If Children a 7.1 out of 10 rating, saying that the album "displays a band that knows how to vary a theme just enough to keep momentum." Robert Christgau gave it a 2-star honorable mention rating, which corresponds to a "likable effort consumers attuned to its overriding aesthetic or individual vision may well enjoy," and said of the album that it was "Poised warily between innocence and experience, d/b/a melody and chaos."

Track listing

Personnel
John Golden-	Mastering
Eric Morrison-	Mixing
Andy Stack-	Audio Engineer, Group Member
Jenn Wasner-	Composer, Group Member, Instrumentation, Vocals, Voices
Wye Oak	- Primary Artist

References

Wye Oak albums
Merge Records albums
2008 debut albums